Nancy Eisenberg (born 1950) is a psychologist and professor at Arizona State University. She was the President of the Western Psychological Association in 2014-2015 and the Division 7 president of the American Psychological Association in 2010-2012. Her research focuses on areas of emotional and social development of children. She is also in charge of a research lab at Arizona State University where undergraduate researchers help in longitudinal studies of social and emotional development in children and young adolescents.

She holds numerous prestigious awards in the field of psychology from institutions such as NICHD and NIMH.

Education 
Eisenberg obtained her B.A. degree in psychology in 1972 from University of Michigan-Ann Arbor and continued her education to obtain a M.A. and a Ph.D. in developmental psychology from the University of California, Berkeley.

Career 
Eisenberg's early work includes being on the board of consulting editors for both the Journal of Genetic of Psychology and Journal of Early Adolescence.

Research
A majority of her research is centered around moral development in children. She has also done research in altruism, empathy, and socialization. Her research also includes cultural factors in emotion regulation, social competence, adjustment, prosocial responding, and developmental psychopathology. Along with numerous research studies, she has also contributed to a vast number of publications. She is also in charge of a research lab at Arizona State University where she leads undergraduate students on studies regarding social, psychological, and moral development in children. Notable achievements for her work include G. Stanley Hall Award for Distinguished Contribution to Developmental Psychology 2009 and William James Fellow Award for Career Contributions in the Basic Science of Psychology in 2011.

Publications
Nancy Eisenberg has written and contributed to a large number of publications and research studies. A full comprehensive list of her publications can be found online.

Awards
Ernest R. Hilgard Award for Contributions in General Psychology, Including "The Division 1" by the American Psychological Association (2007)
International Society for the Study of Behavioral Development Distinguished Scientific Contribution Award (2008)
G. Stanley Hall Award for Distinguished Contribution to Developmental Psychology (2009)
William James Fellow Award for Career Contributions in the Basic Science of Psychology (2011)
Research Awards awarded by the National Institutes of Health NICHD and NiMH6.

Additional sources
Gal, S. D. E., Spinrad, T. L., Eisenberg, N., & Sulik, M. J. (2018). The relations of children’s emotion knowledge to their observed social play and reticent/uninvolved behavior in preschool: Moderation by effortful control. Social Development.
Zhang, L., Eggum-Wilkens, N. D., Eisenberg, N., & Spinrad, T. L. (2017). Children’s shyness, peer acceptance, and academic achievement in the early school years. Merrill-Palmer Quarterly, 63(4), 458–484.
Eisenberg, N. (1986). Altruistic Emotion, Cognition, and Behavior (PLE: Emotion) (1st ed., Vol. 1). London: Taylor & Francis Group. Doi:9781317597421
Eisenberg, N., Cumberland, A., Spinrad, T. L., Fabes, R. A., Shepard, S. A., Reiser, M., . . . Guthrie, I. K. (2001). The Relations of Regulation and Emotionality to Childrens Externalizing and Internalizing Problem Behavior. Child Development, 72(4), 1112-1134. doi:10.1111/1467-8624.00337

Nancy Eisenberg, Tracy Spinrad. Emotion-related regulation: Sharpening the definition. Child Development (2004).
Carlos Valiente, R Fabes, Nancy Eisenberg, Tracy Spinrad. The relations of parental expressivity and support to children's coping with daily stress. Journal of Family Psychology (2004).
Eisenberg, N., Eggum, N. D., & Edwards, A. Empathy-related responding and moral development. Emotions, aggression, and moral development (2010).

References

1950 births
Living people
Arizona State University faculty
University of Michigan alumni
20th-century American psychologists
American women psychologists
21st-century American psychologists
21st-century American women